This is a compilation of pieces for cello and pipe organ. 
See also the entries on cello and the List of compositions for cello and orchestra, List of compositions for cello and piano and List of solo cello pieces.

Ordering is by surname of composer.

A
Thomas Åberg
Fantaisie in A minor
Svensk bröllopsmusik (Swedish Wedding Music)

B
Johann Sebastian Bach
Adagio in C minor, from Toccata, Adagio and Fugue, BWV 564 (trans. Nikolaus Maler)
Adagio, from Violin Concerto no. 2, BWV 1042 (arr. J. Harnoy)
Air, from Suite in D major (trans. Ernst-Thilo Kalke)
Arioso, from Cantata no. 156 (arr. M.J.Isaac)
Six Schübler Chorales, BWV 645-650 (trans. Raphael Wallfisch and Colm Carey)
Siegfried Barchet
Schmerzliches Adagio für Violoncello und Orgel
Alfred Baum
Introduktion und Variationen (Carus-Verlag)
Invocation (Carus-Verlag)
Ludwig van Beethoven
Marcia funèbre, from Symphony No 3 (trans. Ernst-Thilo Kalke)
Herman Berlinski
Days of Awe
Hassidic Suite
Kol nidre
Sinfonia No 10 in A minor for cello and organ
Neithard Bethke
Ludi organi, op. 58 no. 10, Weihnachtspastorale über "Quem pastores laudaverunt"
Rudolf Bibl
Zwei Adagio, op. 30
Lucien Blin
Recueillement
Dirk Blockeel
"Ach Gott vom Himmel sieh darein", Chorale en diminutio for cello and organ
"In paradisum" for cello and organ
"O gloriosa virginum" for cello and organ
Sonata for cello and organ
Leon Boëllmann
Variations symphoniques for cello and organ
Walther Böhme
Two Pieces for cello and organ, op. 15
Émile Bourdon
Andantino religioso op. 15
Max Bruch
Kol Nidrei, op. 47
Ole Borneman Bull
Säterjäntans söndag (Säter girl's Sunday)

C
Pablo Casals
Cant dels Ocells (Song of the Birds)
Frédéric Chopin
Trauermarsch, from the Piano Sonata, op. 35 (trans. Ernst-Thilo Kalke)
Arcangelo Corelli
Adagio, from Sonata, op. 5 no. 5 (trans. J Schuster)
Sonata, op. 5 no. 8 (trans. A. Salmon and J. Lindner)

D
Willem de Fesch
6 Sonatas for cello and basso continuo, op. 8
Marcel Dupré
Sonata for cello and organ, op. 60

E
Edward Elgar
Une Idylle for cello and organ, op. 4 no. 1

F
Gabriel Fauré
 Andante
Après un Rêve (trans. Pablo Casals)
Carl August Fischer
Consolation
César Franck
Andantino

G
Herbert Gadsch
Concertino "In dich hab' ich gehoffet, Herr" for cello and organ
Zsolt Gárdonyi
Variations on a Hungarian Chorale
Lothar Graap
"Befiehl du deine Wege", Variations for cello and organ
"Hinunter ist der Sonne Schein", Chorale suite for cello and organ
Percy Grainger
The Nightingale
Sofia Gubaidulina
In Croce
René Guillou
 Adagio "Hommage à J.S. Bach"
Max Gulbins
Vier kleine Stücke, op. 14 for cello and organ

H
Calvin Hampton
Prelude for Easter Day
Processions through a Black Hole
George Frideric Handel
Adagio, from Suite no. 2 in F major (trans. Ernst-Thilo Kalke)
Joseph Haydn
St Antoni Chorale (trans. Ernst-Thilo Kalke)
Russell Hepplewhite
Smoke Signals 
Invisible Landscapes
Karl Höller
Improvisation über "Schönster Herr Jesu", op. 55
Partita über den Choral "O wie selig seid ihr doch, ihr Frommen" op. 1

I

J
Betsy Jolas
Musique d'autres jours (2020)
Joseph Jongen
Humoresque, op. 92

K
Ernst-Thilo Kalke
Consolation
Es kommt die Nacht
Ich hatt' einen Kameraden
Letzter Abschied
Artur Kapp
Andante religioso
Georg Kestler
Nenia for cello and organ (or harmonium)
Fürchtegott Theodor Kirchner
2 Tonstücke für Violoncello und Orgel, op. 92
Erland von Koch
Folklig marsch (Popular march) no. 2
Bernhard Kroll
Partita über "Lucis creator", op. 148

L
Torsten Laux
Schalom for cello and organ
Oskar Lindberg
Gammal fäbodpsalm från Dalarna (Old pasture hymn from Dalarna)
Wolfgang Lindner
Largo e spiccato for cello and organ

M
Frederik Magle
Sonata for cello and organ "From the earth"
Peter Matthews
Four Seasons for cello and organ
Tim McKenry 
Relentless for Organ and 'Cello
Gustav Adolf Merkel
Andacht
Wolfgang Amadeus Mozart
Ave verum corpus (trans. Ernst-Thilo Kalke)

N

O

P
Tadeusz Paciorkiewicz
Andante calmato
Craig Phillips
A Song Without Words
Daniel Pinkham
Oration

R
Joseph Joachim Raff
Cavatina
 Günther Raphael
Partita über den Choral "Ach Gott, vom Himmel sieh darein", op. 22 no. 1
Sonata for cello and organ, op. 36
Max Reger
Aria, from Suite for violin and piano in A major, Op. 103a
Joseph Rheinberger
Abendlied, No. 3 from Geistliche Gesänge, Op. 69 (originally for choir SSATTB)
3 Pièces, from 6 Pièces for violin and organ, op. 150
Dominique Rivolta
Mélodie transmutée
Daniel Roth
Artizarra, Fantaisie sur un chant populaire basque
Rainer Maria Rückschloss
...in langer Nacht

S
Kaija Saariaho
Offrande pour orgue et violoncelle
Camille Saint-Saëns
Prière, op. 158
Timothy Salter
Vitis flexuosa
Hans-Ludwig Schilling
Fantasia riservata
Hermann Schröder
Salve Regina: cantilena choralis for cello and organ
Franz Schubert
Ave Maria (trans. Ernst-Thilo Kalke)
Joschi Schumann
Sudden lightning
The hell, what a funky prayer
Mikhail Shukh
Ave Maria, for cello and organ
Robert Sirota
Easter Canticles
Heimer Sjöblom
Liten svit i spelmanston (Little suite of folk melodies), op. 36
Wolfgang Stockmeier
Variations on a Theme of Franz Liszt "The Way of the Cross"
Alan Stout
Serenity, op. 11
Joseph Suder
Ariette for cello and organ

T
Eino Tamberg
A play with a big drum, op. 136
Ernst Otto Toller
Drei Stücke for cello and organ (or harmonium), op. 130
Trad.
Deep river (trans. Ernst-Thilo Kalke)
Sometimes I feel like a motherless child (trans. Ernst-Thilo Kalke)

V
Pēteris Vasks
Musique du Soir pour Violoncelle et Orgue

W
Oskar Wermann
Sonata for cello and organ, op. 58
Johannes Weyrauch
Sonate über den Choral "Herzliebster Jesu, was hast du verbrochen"
Kurt Wiklander
Fantasia for cello and organ, op. 5

Z

See also
 Cello sonata
 String instrument repertoire
 List of solo cello pieces
 List of compositions for cello and orchestra
 List of compositions for cello and piano
 Double concerto for violin and cello
 Triple concertos for violin, cello, and piano and Orchestra

References

External links
Repertoire for Solo Cello
Some Composers of Cello Works Dates need to be double-checked against other sources as they do not always agree.

Cello and organ
 
Cello